This list contains Pakistani wedding songs which are performed during Pakistani weddings. Most are traditional folk songs, but also include pop songs as well.

References

Marriage in Pakistan
Pakistani music
Wedding music
Pakistani wedding songs